Friendship Medal may refer to:
 Friendship Medal (China)
 Friendship Medal (Cuba)
 Friendship Medal (Vietnam)